The Patwa are a mainly Jain and Hindu community native to Hindi Belt.Traditionally, they were Hindu baniya.

History 

According to the traditions of the Patwa, who did the work of Pat means Thread they were called Patwa. In some parts of Uttar Pradesh and Madhya Pradesh, people do marriages in Lakhera and believed that who did the work of Lakh the called Lakhera. But Lakhera is a separate community, belonging to Kshatreey and are registered as separate cast in Backward Class list. The Patwa are an endogamous community and follow the principle of gotra exogamy. They are Hindu and worship the goddess Bhagwati and jagdamba.

Traditionally, they had a caste council to settle issues of divorce, minor disputes and cases of adultery.
patwa is part of vaisya community ,a vegetarian hindu vaisya .
some of patwa are super rich but must of poor.

Jain Community  
There are many Jains who are Patwas, an example of Patwa from Udaipur who built most beautiful Patwa Haveli.

Present circumstances 

The Patwa are involved in selling women's decorative articles like earrings, necklaces and cosmetics. They also deal in small household items, such as hand fans made of palm. The community was traditionally associated with threading of beads and binding together of silver and gold threads, while others have expanded into other businesses. They are found all over India, mainly in Maharashtra, Goa, Delhi, Madhya Pradesh, Uttar Pradesh, South India (All India Sri Patwa Mahasabha (1953).

In Bihar, the community is sub-divided as Patwa and Tanti. Tanti is another caste. They do not belong to Patwa caste. The Tanti have three sub-groups, the Gouria, Rewar and Jurihar. The Patwa are found mainly in the districts of Nalanda, Gaya, Bhagalpur, Nawada and Patna districts. Their main gotras include the Gorahia, Chero, Ghatwar, Chakata, Supait, Bhor, Pancohia, Dargohi, Laheda and Rankut and the Patwa are found all over Bihar. The Patwa of Bihar is now mainly power loom operators, while others have expanded into other businesses. The Patwa of Bihar have a statewide caste association, the Patwa Jati Sudhar Samiti.

Raja Man Singh, one of the Navaratan of Akbar, shifted Patwa from Rajasthan to Gaya, Bihar and settled them on the other side to Vishnu Pad Temple, of Falgoo (Niranajana River). According to Hindu Mythology, Pind Daan (a custom dedicated to the worship of ancestors) it is mandatory to offer a piece of cloth in the worshipping. To meet this demand Raja Mansingh shifted them and thus the colony of Patwa is known as Manpur, dedicated to Raja Mansingh.Jewellary and style of temples are some proof which can link Gaya's Patwa connection to Rajasthan.
at present time Linage of patwa community is living in Mumbai the count of patwa community in Mumbai is more than the 5lacks BUT THE MORE PEOPLE DOING THEIRE traditional work at present time many of people are well settled. Patwa is part of Baniya community and they have sub caste in patwa community .
as following as 
khandelwal : mostly called khadwa ,they think as most top at theire cast

References 

Social groups of Rajasthan
Indian castes
Jewellery of India
Occupational surnames
Weaving communities of South Asia